Habib Mahfud A. Boukhreis is the current Sahrawi ambassador to Uganda, also accredited non-resident ambassador to Rwanda, with a base in Kampala. He speaks Hassaniya (a variety of Arabic) and English.

Diplomatic postings
In 1997, Boukhreis was the Sahrawi ambassador in Madagascar, with a base in Antananarivo. On May 6, 1997, he presented his letter of credentials to Albert René, as extraordinary and plenipotentiary non-resident ambassador to the Republic of Seychelles. On June that year, he was also accredited as non-resident ambassador to the Republic of Mauritius.

In 2008, he was appointed as ambassador in charge of International Forums, representing the SADR in some events, as the 13th African Union Summit of Heads of States and Governments of Africa held at Sirte, Libya. On June 5, 2010, Boukhreis presented his credentials to Ugandan President Yoweri Museveni, with another eleven envoyees, as Sahrawi resident ambassador. On December 6, 2011, he also presented his credentials to Rwandan President Paul Kagame.

References

Sahrawi Sunni Muslims
Living people
Polisario Front politicians
Ambassadors of the Sahrawi Arab Democratic Republic to Uganda
Ambassadors of the Sahrawi Arab Democratic Republic to Madagascar
Ambassadors of the Sahrawi Arab Democratic Republic to Mauritius
Ambassadors of the Sahrawi Arab Democratic Republic to Seychelles
Ambassadors of the Sahrawi Arab Democratic Republic to Rwanda
Year of birth missing (living people)